Luna Thiel (born 26 November 1999) is a German athlete. She competed in the mixed 4 × 400 metres relay event at the 2019 World Athletics Championships.

References

External links
 

1999 births
Living people
Place of birth missing (living people)
German female sprinters
World Athletics Championships athletes for Germany
German national athletics champions